The 2015–2016 Sparta Rotterdam season is Sparta's 61st season of play.

Matches

Eerste Divisie

Sparta Rotterdam seasons
Sparta Rotterdam